Sandesh Gour is an Indian film and television actor. He has done a Bollywood movie named Meeradha as lead and it was released on 19 August 2016. Meeradha gave him two Awards as "Critics Award for Acting" at Darbhanga International Film Festival January 2017 and "Special Jury Award for Acting" at Lake City International Film Festival April 2017. He has done short film Muafinaama as lead which got two international film festival awards in 2015. He has done a Telefilm Pragaash which also got two international awards in 2015. He has done many roles in various Indian television shows like Mann Kee Awaaz Pratigya, Surya The Super Cop, Saraswatichandra, Savdhaan India, SuperCops vs Supervillains, Sanjeev Kapoor Ke Kitchen Khiladi, Mahisagar, CID and Meri Aashiqui Tum Se Hi. He was seen in Sab TV show Taarak Mehta Ka Ooltah Chashmah. On 14 September 2018 he has done an Episodic show Pyaar Tune Kya Kiya as protagonist named Vishwa on Zing channel.

In 2013, he also made his Bollywood production company titled Bollywood Entertainments. He said "Yes, it is true that I have registered my company named ‘Bollywood Entertainments'."

Filmography
 Meeradha Bollywood film as lead (Released on 19 August 2016). 
 Bhala Manus Marathi movie as lead (Releasing in August 2019).
 Jhing Premachi Marathi movie as protagonist. Released on 29 June 2018.
 Daya Baai dubbed voice of Chanda's husband.

Short film
 Muafinama (Won two international film festival awards).

Music videos
 "Pagli Tere Liye" music video as lead actor for Zee Music Company in 2019
 "Roothe Chahe Rab" music video as lead actor for Tips Industries directed by Jitendra Singh Tomar in 2020
 "Surmayee nain Tere" music video as lead actor for Zee Music Company directed by Jitendra Singh Tomar in 2020
 "Tum Mere" music video as lead actor for Zee Music Company in 2020
 "Soniye" music video as lead actor for Zee Music Company in 2021
 "Preet Ho Gai Tujhse Santoshi Mata" music video as lead actor for Anukriti Pictures & Music Distributor Movement Creations LLP

Documentary film
 Pragaash (won two international film festival awards).

Television
Star Plus's Mann Kee Awaaz Pratigya and Saraswatichandra
Sony TV's Surya The Super Cop, Sanjeev Kapoor Ke Kitchen Khiladi and CID
Life OK's Savdhaan India and SuperCops vs Supervillains
BIG Magic's Mahisagar
Colors TV's Meri Aashiqui Tum Se Hi
Sab TV's Taarak Mehta Ka Ooltah Chashmah
Doordarshan's Ek Lakshya
 Zing's Pyaar Pehli Baar as Vishwa in season 10 of Pyaar Tune Kya Kiya

Theater plays and drama
 Khol Do –  Writer : Saadat Hasan Manto – Director : Ashok Purang.
 Bade Bhai Sahab – Writer : Munchi Premchandra – Director : Rajesh K Tiwari.
 Chhunav Ka Chakkar – Director : Saurabh Sharma.
 Kasturba Gandhi – Director : Rajesh K Tiwari.
 PARI... Beti Bacho, Beti Padho – Director Rajesh K Tiwari.

Web series 
Think Before... director : Ishwar Singh. 
Women's Desire writer and director: Satyapal Chandra
Berozgaar Balma is Written by Mukesh Mishra ... Director : Sarang Dole

Awards

 Sandesh Gour got "Critics Award for Acting" in his Debut Bollywood Movie Meeradha as lead at DIFF Darbhanga International Film Festival 2017 on 29 January 2017
Sandesh Gour got "Jury Award for Acting" in his Debut Bollywood Movie Meeradha as lead at LCIFF Lake City International Film Festival 2017 on 1 April 2017

References

Living people
Indian male television actors
Male actors in Hindi television
Year of birth missing (living people)